Köllerbach may refer to:

Köllerbach (Saar), a river of Saarland, Germany, tributary of the Saar
Köllerbach, a district of the town Püttlingen in Saarland, Germany